The 64th Wyoming State Legislature was a former meeting of the Wyoming Legislature lasting from January 10, 2017 to January 10, 2019.

The Republican Party held a supermajority in the legislature, which began meeting in 2013; 51 of the 60 seats in the House and 26 of the 30 seats in the Senate are held by Republicans.

Senate

Members of the Wyoming Senate

House

Leadership

Members of the Wyoming House of Representatives

References

Wyoming legislative sessions